The Unfinished Pyramid may refer to:
 The Unfinished Pyramid presented in the reverse side of the Great Seal of the United States
 The Layer Pyramid, dating to the 3rd Dynasty of Egypt c. 2630 BC, possibly unfinished due to the death of the king.
 The Pyramid of Neferefre, dating to the 5th Dynasty c. 2460 BC, unfinished due to the premature death of pharaoh Neferefre.
 The Unfinished Northern Pyramid of Zawyet el'Aryan, dating either to the 3rd or 4th Dynasty of Egypt.
 The Southern South Saqqara pyramid dating to the 13th Dynasty (18th century BC) likely unfinished due to the death of the king.

See also 
 Frustum